Johannes Herbert (28 October 1912 – 30 December 1978) was a German wrestler who competed in the 1936 Summer Olympics.

References

1912 births
1978 deaths
Olympic wrestlers of Germany
Wrestlers at the 1936 Summer Olympics
German male sport wrestlers
Olympic bronze medalists for Germany
Olympic medalists in wrestling
Medalists at the 1936 Summer Olympics
20th-century German people